Thomas H. Hernon (November 4, 1866 – February 4, 1902) was a professional baseball player. He played part of one season in Major League Baseball for the Chicago Colts (now known as the Cubs) in 1897. He was a right-handed batter and a right-handed thrower. He was 5'7½ feet tall and weighed 156 pounds.

Hernon was born in East Bridgewater, Massachusetts, and died in New Bedford, Massachusetts. He is buried in St. Mary Cemetery in New Bedford.

External links 

 Tom Hernon at Baseball Almanac

Chicago Colts players
Seattle Reds players
Helena (minor league baseball) players
Seattle Hustlers players
Oakland Colonels players
Kansas City Cowboys (minor league) players
Kansas City Blues (baseball) players
Columbus Buckeyes (minor league) players
Columbus Senators players
New Bedford Whalers (baseball) players
New Bedford Browns players
Springfield Ponies players
Springfield Maroons players
Providence Clamdiggers (baseball) players
New London Whalers players
Colorado Springs Millionaires players
Norwich Witches players
Minor league baseball managers
Baseball players from Massachusetts
19th-century baseball players
People from East Bridgewater, Massachusetts
Sportspeople from New Bedford, Massachusetts
1866 births
1902 deaths
Sportspeople from Plymouth County, Massachusetts